Caroline Uhler (born 1983) is a Swiss statistician specializing in algebraic statistics and its applications in genomics. She is Henry and Grace Doherty Associate Professor in the Department of Electrical Engineering and Computer Science and Institute for Data, Systems and Society at the Massachusetts Institute of Technology.

Education and career
Uhler was born in Switzerland. She studied mathematics and biology at the University of Zurich, earning a bachelor's degree in mathematics in 2004, and a second bachelor's degree in biology and master's degree in mathematics in 2006. She stayed at the university for a credential as a high school mathematics teacher in 2007, but instead of becoming a teacher she traveled to the US for graduate education at the University of California, Berkeley. There, she earned both a Ph.D. in statistics and a degree in management of technology from the Haas School of Business in 2011. Her doctoral dissertation, Geometry of maximum likelihood estimation in Gaussian graphical models, was supervised by Bernd Sturmfels, an algebraic geometer and algebraic statistician.

She became an assistant professor at the Institute of Science and Technology Austria in 2011, taking leaves in 2012 for postdoctoral research at ETH Zurich and in 2013 for a semester-length return visit to Berkeley as a research fellow. She moved to the Massachusetts Institute of Technology in 2015 as Henry L. and Grace Doherty Assistant Professor in 2015, and was promoted to associate professor in 2018.

Recognition
In 2014, Uhler became an elected member of the International Statistical Institute. In 2015, she was a winner of the Start-Preis of the Austrian Science Fund, and of the Sofja Kovalevskaja Award of the Alexander von Humboldt Foundation, but declined the funding from both awards to move to MIT.

References

External links
Home page

Living people
American women statisticians
Swiss statisticians
University of Zurich alumni
Haas School of Business alumni
MIT School of Engineering faculty
Academic staff of ETH Zurich
Elected Members of the International Statistical Institute
1983 births
21st-century American women
Mathematical statisticians